Hucho ishikawae, the Korean taimen, is a species of salmonid fish found in the border region between North Korea and China, including the Am-nok or Yalu, Dok-ro, Weon-ju and Jang-jin Rivers. Monitoring of the species has been made very difficult because of the lack of access to the areas in which this species occurs and consequently it is rated as data deficient by the IUCN. Like others of Hucho Genus this fish is an active predator.

References

Chyung, M.-K., 1977. The fishes of Korea. Il Ji Sa Publishing Co. Seoul, Korea. 727 p.

ishikawae
Fauna of North Korea
Freshwater fish of China
Fish described in 1928
Taxa named by Tamezo Mori